Roman Petrovich Panin (born 17 February 1989) is a former Russian professional football player.

Club career
He made his Russian Football National League debut for FC Irtysh Omsk on 27 March 2010 in a game against FC Nizhny Novgorod.

External links
 
 
 Career summary by sportbox.ru

1989 births
Living people
Sportspeople from Tula, Russia
Russian footballers
FC Dynamo Moscow reserves players
FC Arsenal Tula players
FC Irtysh Omsk players
Russia youth international footballers
Association football forwards